Inside In is Mike Gordon's first solo album and was released August 26, 2003.  This album was wholly produced during and after the movie, Outside Out and uses aural tracks from it. Included in the liner notes are lyrics to some tracks, art and design by Andrew Cunningham, photography by David Barron, confessions of a room, acronyms, a "good quote" from Col. Bruce Hampton, and "everything else unsaid".

Gordon formed a solo band to tour in support of the album in late 2003.

In 2006, Gordon created an audio and visual project with his mother, artist Marjorie Minkin, featuring sculpture designs set to the music of Inside In. During the summer, he toured with a backing band called Ramble Dove - named after the fictitious band in the Outside Out film.

The album was released on vinyl for the first time as a deluxe double-LP set in conjunction with Record Store Day on April 16, 2011, pressed on 180g orange vinyl and including "Minkinetics", "Trinners March" and "Be Your Tape", three previously unreleased outtake tracks from the album (available only on vinyl).

Reception

Writing for Allmusic, music critic Robert L. Doerschuk praised the album and wrote "One would expect a down-home virtuoso performance from any alumnus of Phish, and that's what you get with Inside In... There's no better way to describe this weird and accessible mix: Inside In is far out."

Track listing
All songs by Mike Gordon unless otherwise noted.
"Take Me Out" – 3:03
"Bone Delay" – 4:20
"Admoop" – 1:56
"Outside Out" – 3:23
"The Beltless Buckler" – 3:22
"Soulfood Man" – 3:28
"The Teacher" – 3:31
"Gatekeeper" – 3:22
"Couch Lady" – 4:01
"Major Minor" – 3:43
"The Lesson" – 3:00
"Exit Wound" (Mike Gordon, Amy Echo, Scott Ellism, Jeff Schartoff, Mike Tempesta) – 3:22
"Steel Bones" (Gordon, Bernie Green) – 5:55
"Take Me Out II" – 2:24
"Take Me Outro" – 2:09

Album Outtakes (available on vinyl release only)
"Minkinetics"
"Trinners March"
"Be Your Tape"

Personnel
Mike Gordon – banjo, bass, guitar, percussion, pedal steel, accordion, keyboards, sound effects, vocals, tubular bells, bass harmonica 
Elizabeth Combs Beglin – vocals, spoken word
Buddy Cage – pedal steel guitar
Vassar Clements – fiddle
Jeff Coffin – clarinet
Jon Fishman – drums
Béla Fleck – banjo
Future Man – percussion
Col. Bruce Hampton – guitar, vocals
James Harvey – piano, trombone, keyboards, clavinet
Ida James – spoken word
Gabe Jarrett – drums
Craig Johnson – trumpet
Jeff Lawson – drums
Russ Lawton – drums
Stuart Paton – percussion
Jared Slomoff – trumpet, background vocals
Gordon Stone – pedal steel guitar
Jimi Stout – spoken word
Heloise Williams – vocals

References

External links
Official website of Inside In

2003 albums
Mike Gordon albums